The 29th Grey Cup was played on November 29, 1941, before 19,065 fans at Varsity Stadium at Toronto.

The Winnipeg Blue Bombers defeated the Ottawa Rough Riders 18–16.

Trivia
This was the last Grey Cup game for the civilian based teams before World War II the games were played by Provisional Military teams until 1945

External links
 
 

Grey Cup
Grey Cup
Grey Cups hosted in Toronto
1941 in Ontario
November 1941 sports events
1940s in Toronto
Ottawa Rough Riders
Winnipeg Blue Bombers